Francesco Lunardini (born 3 November 1984) is an Italian professional footballer who plays for Tre Fiori.

Career
Lunardini began his career with Rimini in 2001, where he spent loan spells at Val di Sangro and Pavia. He signed for Parma in January 2009 for a €1 million along with Daniele Vantaggiato (€1.9M) in co-ownership deal. Rimini also got half of Davide Matteini for €1 million, made the deal involved €1.9 million cash. In June 2010 Parma acquired Lunardini outright for €100,000 (and Vantaggiato for €1.9M in January).

Lunardini then moved to Serie B outfit Triestina in August 2010 for a season-long loan. In summer 2011 he was signed by Gubbio along with Daniel Ciofani. Parma subsidized Gubbio €170,000 as  premi di valorizzazione. On 22 August 2012 he was signed by San Marino. ca. 2013 Parma mutually terminated the contract of Lunardini.

He was signed by Serie D club Fano on 22 August 2013.

References

External links
Goal.com 

1984 births
Living people
Italian footballers
Rimini F.C. 1912 players
Parma Calcio 1913 players
U.S. Triestina Calcio 1918 players
A.S. Gubbio 1910 players
F.C. Pavia players
A.S.D. Victor San Marino players
Serie A players
Serie B players
Serie D players
People from Cesena
Association football midfielders
Footballers from Emilia-Romagna
Sportspeople from the Province of Forlì-Cesena